

CEOs and Chairmen
The position of CEO and Chairman have been assumed as a single position, unless noted (CEOs who were not Chairman were generally President at the time). Since 2006, the role of President has been absorbed into the role of Executive Chairman.

Presidents
The President of Ford Motor Company was a role at the company from 1903 to 2006, with three noted vacancies after Semon Knudsen was fired in 1969, after two vice-chairmen were appointed in 1987, and Philip Benton Jr's retirement on January 1, 1993. The title of President has not been assumed since the retirement of Jim Padilla in 2006 and the shifting of the role's responsibilities to Chief Executive Chairman, William Clay Ford, Jr.

References 

Ford executives
Ford
1903 establishments in the United States